Ventana is a census-designated place in Pima County, in the U.S. state of Arizona. The population was 52 at the 2020 census. The place takes it name from the Spanish word for "window" and is located in the northeastern part of the Tohono O'odham Nation reservation.

Geography

Demographics
At the 2020 census there were 52 people, 16 households, and 10 families living in the CDP. The population density was 50 people per square mile. There were 30 housing units.

The median household income was $20,587. The per capita income for the CDP was $13,461.

References

Census-designated places in Pima County, Arizona
Tohono O'odham Nation
Populated places in the Sonoran Desert